Wilston Samuel Jackson (17 May 1927–15 September 2018) was Britain's first black train driver. Known as 'Bill', he was born in Jamaica in 1927 and moved to the UK as part of the Windrush generation. After working as a fireman, he was appointed train driver in 1962. At one point he drove the Flying Scotsman locomotive. He later emigrated to Zambia where he taught people how to drive trains. He is honoured by a blue plaque at London King's Cross station.

He died on 15 September 2018 at the age of 91.

References

External links 
https://www.theguardian.com/uk-news/2021/oct/25/blue-plaque-for-britains-first-black-train-driver-unveiled-at-kings-cross

1920s births
Year of birth uncertain
2018 deaths

British people of Jamaican descent
British train drivers